Jukka Setala (born 24 February 1967, Helsinki, Finland) is a Finnish designer. He completed his study as an interior architect at the University of Art and Design Helsinki in 1996. He designed a notable lamp but he is best known for his "Fatboy" beanbag chairs.

Exhibitions 
2004 'Muovi' (Plastic), Design Museum, Helsinki
2004 'Dream Team' design exhibition / Design Forum, Helsinki
2002 'Finndesignnow02' / Helsinki
2000 '100- (design-)' / Helsinki
2000 'Young Forum' / Design Forum, Helsinki
1999 'Artificial Nature', furniture exhibition Pit 21, Milan
1999 'New Scandinavian' furniture exhibition / Cologne
1998 'Finnish Design 10' / Design Forum, Helsinki
1997 '25-Points' furniture exhibition / MUOVA, Vaasa, and Suomenlinna, Helsinki
1997 'Young Designers Week', furniture exhibition / Martela, Helsinki
1997 'Talente 1997' / Munich
1997 'Borens Award 1996' / Design Forum, Helsinki and Malmö Form & Design Center
1996 'Nordisk Glass', Malmö Form & Design Center
1996 'Young Forum' / Design Forum, Helsinki
1996 'The Forces of Light' / Rake Gallery, Helsinki
1995 'Giovani e Materia' / Firenze
1994 '4' / NuKu Galleria, Oulu
1994 Jewellery exhibition / Gallery PUR-PUR, Frankfurt am Main
1993 Furniture Exhibition / Copenhagen
1991 Retretti, sculpture exhibition / Punkaharju

Acknowledgements and awards 
2006 Best New Furniture in Europe 2006 / Reader's Digest, Europe
2001 Merket for God Design
1999 Honorary mention 'Valo-99' (Light 99) / light design competition, Finland
1995 Coats Opti Oy, 1st prize / design competition, Finland
1994 Stala Oy, Harjavalta Oy, Naber & Co Oy, design competition, 3rd prize with Ilkka Koskela / Finland
1993 Jorvas High-Tech centre, graphic design, 1st prize / Finland
Own design office since 1996 under the name Suunnittelu- and Muotoilutoimisto Jukka Setälä Oy
Furniture design teacher at the University Of Art And Design Helsinki since 1999

References

External links
 Finnish Design Shop: Jukka Setälä
 Design House Stockholm: Designers

1967 births
Living people
Artists from Helsinki
Finnish architects